Myyryläinen is a surname. Notable people with the surname include:

Frans Myyryläinen (1881–1938), Finnish Red Guard
Kari Myyryläinen (born 1963), Finnish racing cyclist

Finnish-language surnames